Harry Wililiam Baum (November 23, 1874 – March 3, 1950) was an American college football coach and construction engineer. He served as the head coach at Tulane University in 1896. Baum attended the University of Illinois, where he played on the football team as a halfback.

Biography
Baum attended the University of Illinois, where he played on the football team as a halfback. He graduated from Illinois in 1895 with a degree in civil engineering. After college, he undertook pneumatic foundation work in St. Louis, Missouri.

He served as the first paid Tulane football coach in 1896. His salary was funded through gate receipts and monthly dues from members of the Tulane Athletic Association. He coached the Olive and Blue to a 3–2 record. In the game against Louisiana State, with Tulane leading, 2–0, Baum attempted to substitute a player not enrolled at the university. LSU's coach protested the substitution, and Tulane forfeited the game, which was recorded as a 6–0 decision in favor of LSU. After the season in its December meeting, the Southern Intercollegiate Athletic Association sanctioned the school by disallowing it to field an intercollegiate team the following year. Without a football team for the 1897 season, Baum left New Orleans. He returned to his alma mater to serve as an assistant coach under George Huff.

In 1920, Baum entered the engineering contracting business. He worked on the construction of the state capitol buildings in Salt Lake City, Oklahoma City, and Boise, Idaho, and the Broadmoor Hotel in Colorado Springs. Baum died on March 3, 1950.

Head coaching record

References

External links
 

1874 births
1950 deaths
19th-century players of American football
American civil engineers
American football halfbacks
Illinois Fighting Illini football players
Illinois Fighting Illini football coaches
Tulane Green Wave football coaches
People from Vermilion County, Illinois
Coaches of American football from Illinois
Players of American football from Illinois